Tawanda Jethro Maswanhise (born 20 November 2002) is a Zimbabwean footballer who plays as a midfielder or winger for Leicester.

Career

Maswanhise started his career with English Premier League side Leicester.

Personal life

He is the son of Zimbabwean sprinter Jeffrey Maswanhise.

References

External links

 

2002 births
Association football midfielders
Association football wingers
Leicester City F.C. players
Living people
Zimbabwean footballers